Lanji is a statutory town in the Lanji tehsil of Balaghat district in Madhya Pradesh, India. It is administered by a nagar panchayat, and is part of the Lanji assembly constituency and the Lanji community development block.

Lanji is located close to the Madhya Pradesh's border with Chhattisgarh and Maharashtra. It is located approximately 62 km from the district headquarters Balaghat. It is home to the Koteshwar Shiva temple, Gangli-raja (a site of the Gondwana Kingdom),  the Lanji Fort (site under archeological survey of India) and a very beautiful waari dam is situated about 10 km distance from lanji.

History 

Lanji was earlier known as Lanjika, and was ruled by a branch of the Kalachuris of Ratnapura. During the Mughal period, it was a mahal (administrative division), as mentioned in the Ain-i-Akbari. Before the formation of the Balaghat district in 1867, it was a pargana (administrative unit).

Demographics 

|The Lanji Nagar Panchayat has population of 13,558; including 6,837 males and 6,721 females.

Hindi is the major language spoken here; notable minority languages include Marathi and some rural languages. Lanji is home to migrants from other areas, including from Chhattisgarh in east, Maharashtra in south, and other parts of Madhya Pradesh in north.

Geography 

The Lanji tehsil is situated on the border of Madhya Pradesh with Maharashtra and Chhattisgarh. The land includes plateau, forest, and the Maikal Hills.

A local pond shaped like the number "52" is called "Bawan talab" ("52 talab") by some locals.

Education 

Lanji has several schools, including

 Government Model Higher Secondary School Lanji
Saket Public School Lanji
Central India Academy Lanji
Pali Academic Institution, Bisoni,  Lanji
Sarswati Shishu Mandir, Lanji

Economy 

Rice is the main crop in Lanji, and seed is sown at the beginning of the rainy season in June–July.

Tourism
Notable tourist places in and around Lanji include:

Lanji Fort & Temple
Lanjkayi Temple
Koteshwar Temple
Balaji Temple
Gangli Raja
Lodama Waterfall
Beautiful natural lake view point at Waari (about 10 km from lanji)
Sai Temple at Kakodi (About 7 km from lanji)
Son river is main source of tourism and cropping

Politics 

Lanji is administered by a nagar panchayat.

It is part of the Lanji Vidhan Sabha constituency. Hina Kaware, the Deputy Speaker of the Madhya Pradesh Legislative Assembly, is the current legislator from Lanji and Kirnapur. Past legislators include Bhagwat Bhau Nagpure.

In the past, Naxalites have operated in the area.

Naxalism
Lanji is suffering from naxalism,  many naxalite have active there. Generally it is very common problems in South East Madhya Pradesh.

References 

Villages in Balaghat district